Surajgarh railway station is a railway station in Jhunjhunu district, Rajasthan. Its code is SRGH. It serves Surajgarh town. The station consists of 2 platforms. Passenger, Express trains halt here.

Trains

The following trains halt at Surajgarh railway station in both directions:

 Delhi Sarai Rohilla–Sikar Express
 Sikar–Delhi Sarai Rohilla Intercity Express

References

Railway stations in Jhunjhunu district
Jaipur railway division